Jordaan Kyle Brown (born 13 March 1992) is an English footballer who plays for  side Rushall Olympic, where he plays as a defender.

At club level, he has played in three countries: in England for AFC Wimbledon and Staines Town; in Finland for VPS; and in Norway for Flekkerøy.

Club career

AFC Wimbledon
Jordaan Brown signed for English club AFC Wimbledon in 2010 and didn't play any games. After one season, in 2011, he left Wimbledon on a free transfer to Chipstead.

Staines Town

2012-13
After signing for Staines Town, Brown became a fan favorite, and in his first season played 33 games, scored one goal, and was booked zero times. In January that season, he was rumored to be on the books of an unknown League 1 team, but obviously didn't make the move as he played the day after the window closed in a 1–0 win over Bath City.

2013-14

FA Cup
Jordaan Brown had a memorable year in 2013–14 at Staines. Staines made a run in the FA Cup by qualifying for the first round proper. In the third round qualifying, Staines took on Sittingbourne. The Swans won 4–1, Jordaan Brown setting up the second. They drew Poole 0–0 in the first leg, but away, beat them 1–0 in the second round. Though they lost to Brentford 5–0 in the first round proper, but the run is remembered in Staines' history.

Conference South
That year, Staines finished 8th, narrowly missing the play-off spot. Brown was however injured earlier in the season. He scored once and played 38 games. He was only booked once that year, before being sighted by top division Finnish team VPS.

VPS

UEFA Europa League
In 2014, he signed a contract with Finnish club VPS. When asked why he left Staines, he said simply "I wanted to get a chance to play in Europe," and on his debut he got his wish; against Swedish club Brommapojkarna, played in the Europa League and not only played, but starred with an incredible run down the wing, and a fabulous cross for Jordan Seabrook to finish off. VPS won the match 2–1.

Flekkerøy
In February 2015 he signed for Flekkerøy in the Norwegian Second Division for a small fee.

Return to England
In January 2016, Brown returned to England to sign for Hayes & Yeading United before joining Redditch United that summer. On 10 January 2017, whilst at Redditch, Brown featured as a trialist for Grimsby Town in a 4–3 reserve match win against Rotherham United.

On 11 August 2017, Brown signed for Stafford Rangers. In April 2018, Brown picked up three awards from the club after his debut season.

Stourbridge
On 9 June 2018, Brown signed for Stourbridge.

Tamworth

On 6 June 2021, Brown was announced as a signing for Southern League Premier Division Central rivals Tamworth. Brown made his debut for Tamworth on the 14 August 2021, the opening day of the Southern League Premier Division Central season away at Royston Town coming on as a 68th-minute substitute for Henri Wilder.

Brown completed the next 3 league matches, but surcome to injury on his fifth Southern League Premier Division Central appearance, as Tamworth hosted local rivals Nuneaton Borough at home on 30 August 2021. Brown was replaced by Ben Hart at half time, as a Dan Creaney hat-trick helped Tamworth to a 3-0 victory.

Following all of September on the side lines, Jordaan returned to first team action on 2 October 2021, as Tamworth defeated Leiston 3-1 away from home in the 3rd qualifying round of the FA Cup, with Brown completing the full match.

Tamworth returned to Southern League Premier Division Central action the following week as they came up against Rushall Olympic at Dales Lane. Brown's game was ended after just 6 minutes, as a hamstring injury forced him off, being replaced by his former Stourbridge team mate Martin Riley. Tamworth went on to pick up a 2-1 victory, with both goals coming from Dan Creaney in injury time.

Brown scored his first goal for Tamworth in what turned out to be the players last game for the club on 19 March 2022, when he scored a second half leveller to help the club draw 2-2 away at AFC Rushden & Diamonds in a Southern League Premier Division Central fixture.

Rushall Olympic
On 23 March 2022, Brown swapped Tamworth for Southern League Premier Division Central rivals Rushall Olympic. Jordaan made his debut in the next fixture on 26 March 2022, as Rushall Olympic defeated Stratford Town by a 4-1 scoreline in a Southern League Premier Division Central fixture.

With Rushall Olympic qualifying for the Southern League Premier Division Central playoffs, they faced Coalville Town in an away fixture on 26 April 2022. Unfortunately for Brown he received a red card in the 29th minute, and Rushall Olympic were defeated 3-0.

On 3 June 2022, Rushall Olympic confirmed that Brown had re-signed with them for the 2022–23 season.

International career
In 2014, Brown confirmed that Jamaica had contacted him with regards to a possible international call-up.

Career statistics

Club

References

External links

English footballers
Footballers from Greater London
1992 births
Living people
English people of Jamaican descent
Association football defenders
AFC Wimbledon players
Chipstead F.C. players
Staines Town F.C. players
Vaasan Palloseura players
Flekkerøy IL players
Hayes & Yeading United F.C. players
Redditch United F.C. players
Stafford Rangers F.C. players
Stourbridge F.C. players
Tamworth F.C. players
Rushall Olympic F.C. players
Southern Football League players
National League (English football) players
Veikkausliiga players
English expatriate footballers
Expatriate footballers in Finland
Expatriate footballers in Norway
Black British sportspeople